Devanthakudu is a 1984 Indian Telugu-language action film directed by S. A. Chandrasekhar. The film stars Chiranjeevi and Vijayashanti. It is a remake of Chandrasekhar's own 1983 Kannada film Geluvu Nannade. The film was released on 12 April 1984 and emerged a commercial success.

Plot 

Vijay Kumar is a college student who is daring and dashing and has a weakness for betting and challenges. Chanti is Vijays's friend, who study in the same college. He challenges Vijay to kill a person and escape without being caught and without proof and this person is a professor. Vijay takes it lightly and tries to play away by acting as if he killed the professor but he is really killed by the time he reaches there and he is accused of the murder. The rest of the plot forms on how he frees himself from the blame and who killed the professor and why?

Cast 
Chiranjeevi as Vijay
Vijayashanti as Shanti
G. V. Narayana Rao as Chanti
Gollapudi Maruti Rao as Ramanujam
Gummadi as Prabhakar Rao

Production 
Devanthakudu is a remake of Chandrasekhar's own 1983 Kannada film Geluvu Nannade. Cinematography was handled by N. Kesava, and editing by Gowtham Raju. This is the first film for Thotapalli Madhu as dialogue writer. Producer Narayana Rao cast Vijayashanti as the lead actress after being impressed with her performance in Pelli Chesi Choopistaam (1983). Principal photography began in late October 1983. With the exception of the song sequences, the main sequences were completed in 22 days.

Soundtrack 
The soundtrack was composed by J. V. Raghavulu, with lyrics by Veturi, Gopi and Jyothirmayi.

Release 
Devanthakudu was released on 12 April 1984.

References

External links 

1980s Telugu-language films
1984 action films
1984 films
Films directed by S. A. Chandrasekhar
Films scored by J. V. Raghavulu
Indian action films
Telugu remakes of Kannada films